Norman Hill (born 1933) is an American administrator, activist and labor leader.

Norman Hill or Norm Hill may also refer to:

 Sir Norman Hill, 1st Baronet (18631944) of the Hill Baronets
 Sir Norman Gray Hill, 2nd Baronet (died 1944) of the Hill Baronets
 Norman Graham Hill (19291975), British racing driver and team owner
 Norm Hill (1929after 1948), Canadian football player
 Norman Hill (cricketer) (born 1935), English cricketer
  (1906-1996), American cyclist

See also 
 Norman Hill Reservoir